Suresh Kamatchi is an Indian film producer, director and writer who predominantly works in Tamil movie Industry. He is known for producing the movie Maanaadu, starring Silambarasan which became a huge hit by crossing the 100 crore club. He is the director and writer of the movie Miga Miga Avasaram, which raised the issue of the hardships faced by female police cops. After the release of the movie, Tamil Nadu Chief Minister M. K. Stalin announced that women police should not be posted as roadside security.

Filmography

References

External links 

Tamil film producers
Film producers from Tamil Nadu

1981 births
Living people